Noor Neelofa Mohd Noor (born 10 February 1989) is a Malaysian actress, television presenter, commercial model and entrepreneur. She rose to fame when participated in a drama queen competition, Dewi Remaja, winning the Dewi Remaja 2009/10 title organised by the Malaysian teen magazine, Remaja. She received her Bachelor International Trade and Marketing education at Sunway University College. Neelofa was named amongst 'Forbes 30 Under 30 Asia' in 2017. Beyond her entertainment career, she has been involved in multiple business ventures and launched Naelofar Hijab.

Early life
Neelofa was born in Pasir Mas, Kelantan and is of Iranian, Pakistani and Malay descent.

Neelofa studied in Maktab Rendah Sains MARA Langkawi, and achieved excellent results. After graduating, she studied and took A Levels (June 2007 – June 2009) for two years at KDU University College. Her dream was to further her studies in the United States of America, but her family did not approve of her decision. Neelofa then pursued her studies at Sunway University in Bachelor of International Business & Marketing.

Entertainment career
Neelofa is a winner in Dewi Remaja (Miss Teen Malaysia) 2009/2010. She appeared in Kau Yang Terindah as Alisya and is a host of the television programs MeleTOP and Nona.

In 2014, she took acting classes at the New York Film Academy. Alongside Nabil Ahmad, Neelofa was also a host for a Malaysian television programme, MeleTOP aired on Astro Ria. She announced on the series that she was resigning as the host in December 2019 after seven years.

Positive reviews of her were given in the press and from the public for her acting in Lukisan Takdir and Wan Embong.

Personal life
Neelofa's grandfather, Noor Mohamed Mohammad Din died on 20 November 2018 at the age of 83, but his cause of death is unknown. She is a cousin of celebrity chef, Adam Didam who died on 19 May 2019 due to lung infection. On 15 October 2020, Neelofa decided to wear niqab.

On 27 March 2021, she married televangelist and actor, Haris Ismail who is six years of her junior. Their first child, a son called Muhammad Bilal, was born on 29 January 2022.

Filmography

Film

TV series

Telemovie

Host

TV Appearance

Theatre

Music video appearance

Bibliography

Business ventures
Outside of showbiz career, Neelofa also involved in several business ventures including contact lens brand Lofalens, health care products Beautea Slim pills, and Muslim women's clothing brand Naelofar Hijab, which is sold through online and retail stores in Selangor and distributors across Malaysia and Singapore.

Influencer 
With more than eight million followers on Instagram, Naelofar has become a fashion icon for many Muslim women who wear the hijab, or 'tudung' as it is referred to in the region of Malaysia and Singapore. She has fronted campaigns for Dior, Lancome and Swarovski, representing modest fashion at shows in New York, Milan and Paris Fashion Week.

She became the first Malaysian to win the 2019 Influencer Awards at Monaco under the Entrepreneur category on 7 October 2019. Each nomination was chosen by a jury, with the nominations coming from all over the world.

On 8 December 2017, AirAsia appointed Neelofa as its new non-executive independent director. Tony Fernandes, the AirAsia Group chief executive officer described Neelofa as "super smart, young and independent". She resigned as director on 19 August 2020 due to "her other personal commitments”.

On 18 December 2020, she received the Business Icon Award during Nona Superwoman Award 2020 presentation by the women's magazine Nona.

Naelofar Hijab
Neelofa founded and helmed NH Prima Sdn Bhd as its director since 2014. Her hijab brand, "Naelofar Hijab" is sold in more than 37 countries including Singapore, Brunei, Indonesia, Australia, UAE, United Kingdom and Europe.

In June 2017, the brand took on new heights when it collaborated with AirAsia to design hijab for female pilots of AirAsia and AirAsia X.

In conjunction with her birthday celebration in 2018, Neelofa launched a turban range, “Be Lofa Turban” at Zouk KL. The new turban line was sold out in less than 24 hours after launching. However, she received backlash from Internet commentators for holding her product launch in the nightclub . On 1 March 2018, she has issued a public statement of apology saying "I would like to sincerely apologise for causing stress and negative sentiments on the selection of the venue."

In 2019, she has partnered with Starbucks to produce the Starbucks x Naelofar exclusive collection which retailed only at Starbucks. Within five years, she has sold more than 10 million hijabs.

Nilofa Group
In December 2019, Neelofa introduced the Nilofa brand with the banana milk as its first product, to the Malaysian market under the Nilofa Group name. An advertisement of the product claimed that the milk would have benefits such as reducing obesity, lowering high blood pressure, increasing metabolism rate and removing toxins from the body. UK-based general surgeon Dr Nur Amalina Che Bakri used Twitter to call out these claims false advertising.

Neelofa's response was that the advertising was published by the marketing agency without her company's approval. She kept her team small and had outsourced the marketing. The controversy led Malaysian Ministry of Health (MOH) to visit the factory to investigate the processes of the milk product behind the claims. MOH found no major issues with the packaging but gave some recommendations concerning packaging the product to clearly communicate the product as a banana milk.

In 2020, Chatime collaboration with Neelofa to launch their new menu Nilofa Dalgonana. The drink are made from her own banana milk. In March 31, 2021 Neelofa and her husband PU Riz get caught by travelling to Langkawi for honeymoon but she denied it because she travelling to Langkawi for a business trip not for honeymoon. She says, she and her husband will attend for launch a new branch Chatime at Langkawi.

The Noor
In 2021, her launch her own Islamic content mobile application called The Noor. Beside that Noor collaboration with Fipper.

Endorsements

Philanthropy and endorsement
In April 2012, Neelofa alongside Nazim Othman, Fizo Omar, Zoey Rahman, Intan Ladyana and Aiman Hakim Ridza was appointed as the Young Biz Icons for Oxford Centre of Excellence (Oxcell). According to Oxcell, "The appointment of six icons was based on academic success and career development in the arts". Through this program, the celebrity icons will share their experiences throughout involved in the world of business and the arts.

In July 2013, the Malaysian private, free-to-air television channel, TV3 appointed Neelofa along with Adi Putra, Nora Danish, Fiza Sabjahan, Amar Asyraf, Nelydia Senrose, Tasha Shilla and Aiman Hakim Ridza as the ambassador for Anugerah Syawal 2013. According to TV3 "The appointment of these celebrities is to promote programs on television and radio throughout the month of Shawwal."

Controversies

During the wedding ceremony between Neelofa and PU Riz on March 27, 2021, the pictures of the audience sitting close and violating the standard operating procedure (SOP) for controlling COVID-19 infection became contagious and received criticism from the people of the country in general.  This caught the attention of the police who opened an investigation paper on the violation under Section 21A of the Prevention and Control of Infectious Diseases Act 1988 (Act 342), and called on the organizers, hotel owners and family members involved to assist in the investigation.   Meanwhile, Minister in the Prime Minister's Department (Religious Affairs), Zulkifli Mohamad Al-Bakri who was also present and gave a speech at their wedding ceremony declined to comment further on the collision.

Awards and nominations

References

External links

 
 Neelofa on YouTube

1989 births
Living people
21st-century Malaysian actresses
Malaysian film actresses
Malaysian people of Malay descent
Malaysian Muslims
Malaysian people of Pakistani descent
Malaysian television personalities
People from Kelantan
Malaysian people of Indian descent